Deborah Gregory is the author of the book series The Cheetah Girls. She was  co-producer of the Disney Channel Original Movies The Cheetah Girls and The Cheetah Girls 2 and an executive producer for The Cheetah Girls: One World.

Early life
Deborah Gregory was born in Brooklyn, New York. When she was only three years old, her mother was institutionalized, and young Deborah was put into foster care until she outgrew the system at the age of 18. As a teenager, she started designing her own clothes and fantasized about a singing career. At the age of eighteen, she attended the Fashion Institute of Technology (FIT) and received her A.A.S. 
She graduated in 1986 with a BS in Cultural Studies from Empire State College (Metropolitan Center, NYC).

Deborah was featured in Lise Funderburgs documentary book Black White Other: Biracial Americans Talk About Race and Identity (1995).

The Cheetah Girls
The book series is about five ambitious girls who form a singing group and achieve their dreams in the fictional "Jiggy Jungle." These girls have their own set of ethics as well as their own language, which Gregory provides a glossary for in her books. The girls pictured on the cover of the books are made up of an actual three girl singing group called Before Dark, an aspiring ballerina and a performer who was starring in "The Lion King." Gregory's inspiration for the musical group was the R&B group Destiny's Child and her own childhood aspirations of musical stardom. The original Disney movie starred Raven-Symoné. It also starred Sabrina Bryan, Kiely Williams, and Adrienne Bailon of 3LW. Two music albums were produced as a result of the two Disney Channel movies. There are 22 books in the Cheetah Girls series, six of which are books that tie directly to the films. In 2001, the series became the Blackboard Children's Book of the Year.

Fashion
After graduating from FIT, Gregory went from designing and making clothes, to traveling to Europe and spending time as a runway model. Later in her career, specializing in cheetah print and plus sizes, Gregory opened the boutiques Toto and Fun in Larger Sizes, both located in New York.

Writing
Gregory has written for various magazines including Grace, More, US, and Entertainment Weekly. She has also won awards, acknowledging her contributions to "Essence Magazine" since 1992. In 1999, she penned the book series The Cheetah Girls. The books were adapted into a series of original movies by Disney Channel, starting in 2003. She also wrote the Catwalk trilogy including "Catwalk", "Catwalk: Strike a Pose", and "Catwalk: Rip the Runaway."

Comedy
Having written humor pieces in a variety of magazines, Gregory created "Working Girlz," an alternative-comedy one woman show. It debuted in 1996 at the New York International Fringe Festival and won the award for Best Comedy in 2001. It was also featured at Caroline's Comedy Club and Dixon Place in New York.

References

American women writers
Year of birth missing (living people)
Living people
People from Brooklyn
Film producers from New York (state)
American women film producers
21st-century American women